Lotus Tower, also referred to as Colombo Lotus Tower, is a  tall tower, located in Colombo, Sri Lanka. It has been called a symbolic landmark of Sri Lanka. As of 2019, the tower is the tallest self-supported structure in South Asia; the second tallest structure in South Asia after the guy-wire-supported INS Kattabomman in India; the 11th tallest tower in Asia and the 19th tallest tower in the world. It was first proposed to be built in the suburb of Peliyagoda but later the Government of Sri Lanka decided to change the location. The lotus-shaped tower is used for communication, observation and other leisure facilities. Construction is estimated to have cost USD 113 million.

Location 
After an initial decision to construct the tower within the confines of a suburb of the country's economic capital city of Colombo, Sri Lanka's government announced their plans to shift the location to the heart of the city. The tower's new location is on the waterfront of the Beira Lake.

Construction 
With the witness of the President of Telecommunications Regulatory Commission of Sri Lanka (TRCSL), the Secretary of the Sri Lanka Foreign Ministry, the Presidents of China National Electronics Import & Export Corporation (CEIEC) and Aerospace Long March International Trade Co. Ltd (ALIT) signed the contract with the Director-General of TRCSL, Anusha Palpita, for the project on 3 January 2012.

The project commenced during the tenure of President Mahinda Rajapakse and the construction began on 20 January 2012 following a foundation stone-laying ceremony. The site is located on the waterfront of Beira Lake and alongside a part of the D. R. Wijewardene Mawatha.

In December 2014, the tower's construction crossed the  milestone and as of July 2015, the tower had reached .

Design and function 

 
The design of this building is inspired by the Lotus flower. The lotus symbolizes purity within Sri Lankan culture and is also said to symbolize the country's flourishing development. The tower base is inspired by the lotus throne and will also be formed by two inverted trapezoidal. The tower's color is planned to alternate between pink and light yellow by smooth transition- an effect achieved by coating the glass.

Lotus Tower's main revenue sources will be tourism and antenna leasing. It will function as a radio and television broadcasting antenna ISDB-T and proposed DVB-T2 support structure for 50 television services, 35 FM Radio Stations and 20 telecommunication service providers, and will house a variety of tourist attractions .

The tower has four entrances, with two being used as VIP (distinguished guests and state leaders) entrances. A telecommunications museum and restaurant are located on the ground floor. The tower podium consists of 6 floors. The first floor of the podium will accommodate a museum and two exhibition halls. The second floor will be utilised for several conference halls with seating space in excess of 500 people. Restaurants, supermarkets, and food courts will be situated on the third floor. A 1000-seat auditorium will be located on the fourth floor, which will also be used as a ballroom. The fifth floor will include luxury hotel rooms, large ballrooms, and the seventh floor will host an observation gallery. The landscaping is planned in the form of a large water park.

Transport Hub 
The Colombo Monorail, which was a proposed monorail system in Colombo, and the BRT system were to converge at a common 'multi-modal hub' located in close proximity to the Lotus Tower, making the tower a major city center. The Monorail was canceled in 2016, and both, a light rail will be constructed in Malabe.

Controversy 
During the opening ceremony which was held on 16 September 2019, President Maithripala Sirisena at a ceremonial speech mentioned and claimed an allegation on a scam regarding an advance of 2 billion rupees which was given to an approved company ALIT in 2012 by the then government, was later revealed in 2016 that such a company did not exist. However, this was later proven to be false as ALIT was in fact the acronym of the Chinese state-owned Aerospace Long-March International Trade Co. ALIT denied receiving the payment claiming that the entire amount was paid to the China National Electronics Import & Export Corporation (CEIEC) as had ALIT left the project. It also noted that the TRC paid $15.6 million (2 billion rupees) into CEIEC's account in Exim Bank in October 2012, the same amount which Sirisena claims to have been "misappropriated" by ALIT.

See also 
Nelum Pokuna Mahinda Rajapaksa Theatre
List of tallest structures in Sri Lanka

References 

Communication towers in Sri Lanka
2019 establishments in Sri Lanka
Tourist attractions in Colombo
Tallest
Towers
Lists of construction records